The Turkey national women's cricket team is the team that represents Turkey in international women's cricket. In April 2018, the International Cricket Council (ICC) granted full Women's Twenty20 International (WT20I) status to all its members. Therefore, all Twenty20 matches played between Turkey women and other ICC members after 1 July 2018 are full WT20I matches.

In December 2020, the ICC announced the qualification pathway for the 2023 ICC Women's T20 World Cup. The Turkey women's team were scheduled to make their debut at the 2021 ICC Women's T20 World Cup Europe Qualifier. However, in August 2021, they were forced to withdraw from the tournament, as they were unable to get approval to travel from the Turkish Sports Ministry.

References

External links
 Official website

 
Women's
Women's national cricket teams